Carlos Marfori y Callejas, 1st Marquess of Loja (born 10 November 1821), was a Spanish-Italian politician who served as Overseas Minister from 1867 to 1868.

Family 
Born in San Fernando, Cádiz, son of Francisco-Antonio Marfori y Rodi, an Italian nobleman, and María-Josefa Callejas y Pavón. He was married to María de la Concepción Fernández de Córdoba y Campos, a Prime Minister Narváez's cousin. He died in 1892 in Madrid.

Political career 
Mayor and Civil Governor of Madrid (1857)
Member of Spanish Parliament for Loja and Granada (1857–1884)
Overseas Minister (1867–1868)
Provisional Army Minister and lifelong Senator from 1891.

Titles and honours 
Marquessate of Loja
Gentleman of the Bedchamber
Collar of the Order of Charles III
Grand Cross of the Order of Charles III
Grand Cross of the Order of Isabella the Catholic
Knight of the Sovereign Military Order of Malta
Commander of the Order of Christ

References 

1821 births
1892 deaths
People from San Fernando, Cádiz
19th-century Spanish nobility
19th-century Spanish politicians